Boys and Girls in America is the third studio album by the Hold Steady, released on October 3, 2006, by Vagrant Records.

On August 18, 2006, first single "Chips Ahoy!" was released as a free download from music site Pitchfork Media.  The second single, "Stuck Between Stations" began to appear on campus radio playlists in November 2006.

Backing vocals for the track "Chillout Tent" are provided by Soul Asylum's Dave Pirner and the Reputation's Elizabeth Elmore.  Dana Kletter (ex-Blackgirls, Dear Enemy, and Hole's Live Through This) contributed backing vocals to "Chips Ahoy!", "You Can Make Him Like You", and "First Night".

The album title is a line taken from the opening lines of the song "Stuck Between Stations" ("There are nights when I think that Sal Paradise was right/Boys and girls in America have such a sad time together"), which in turn refers to a quote from American novelist and poet Jack Kerouac's 1957 novel On the Road and its narrator, Sal Paradise.  The title is repeated in the lyrics in "First Night."

Boys and Girls in America has sold 94,000 albums as of April 2010.

Critical reception

The album received a metascore of 85 out of 100 on Metacritic, making it tied with four other albums for the 12th best-reviewed album of 2006. Magnet and The Onion's AV Club named it the best album of 2006.

Pitchfork rated Boys and Girls in America 9.4 out of 10, and named it the fifth-best album of the year. They later ranked it as the 64th best album of the decade.

Yahoo! Music ranked the album #9 on their list of the top 25 albums of 2006.

The song "Stuck Between Stations" was ranked #12 on Pitchfork's list of the top 100 songs of 2006 and #63 on the best of 2000's list.

"Chillout Tent" was ranked #33 in Rolling Stones list of 100 best songs of 2006.

The song "Massive Nights" was always used at the Beginning of Colin Murray's Radio 1 Show, after the words, "New music, Alternative Classics, Drums" due to the drum roll introduction to the song.

Other versions
The song "Girls Like Status" was featured on the album Aqua Teen Hunger Force Colon Movie Film for Theaters Colon the Soundtrack.

Track listing
All songs written by Craig Finn, Tad Kubler and Franz Nicolay; except where noted.
"Stuck Between Stations" – 4:10
"Chips Ahoy!" – 3:09
"Hot Soft Light" – 3:53
"Same Kooks" (Finn, Kubler) – 2:47
"First Night" – 4:54
"Party Pit" (Finn, Nicolay) – 3:56
"You Can Make Him Like You" – 2:48
"Massive Nights" – 2:54
"Citrus" (Finn, Kubler) – 2:44
"Chillout Tent" – 3:42
"Southtown Girls" (Finn, Kubler) – 5:10

Bonus tracks on Japanese edition
"Against the Wind" (Bob Seger) – 5:17 (Bob Seger and the Silver Bullet Band cover)
"Stuck Between Stations" (Acoustic) – 4:13

Bonus tracks on Australian edition
"For Boston" – 3:17
"Girls Like Status" – 3:08
"Arms and Hearts" – 3:51
"American Music" (Gordon Gano) – 3:47 (Violent Femmes cover)

Bonus tracks on U.S. iTunes edition
"Girls Like Status" – 3:08
"Arms and Hearts" – 3:51

Personnel
Adapted from the album liner notes.

The Hold Steady
Craig Finn 
Tad Kubler
Galen Polivka
Franz Nicolay
Bobby Drake

Additional musicians
Jean Cook – violin
Caleb Burhans – viola
Peter Hess – tenor saxophone, horn arrangements
Lloyd Debonis – trumpet
Alan Ferber – trombone
Drew Glackin – lap steel
Dana Kletter – additional vocals
Dave Pirner – vocals on "Chillout Tent"
Elizabeth Elmore – vocals on "Chillout Tent"

Technical
John Agnello – producer, engineer, mixing
Ted Doherty – assistant engineer
Chris DeCocco – assistant engineer
Ted Young – mixing assistant
Greg Calbi – mastering
Steve Fallone – mastering assistant
Marina Chavez – photography
Ben Goetting – layout, design 
Sacha Penn – typography

References

2006 albums
The Hold Steady albums
Vagrant Records albums
Albums produced by John Agnello